Kirchham is a municipality in the district of Gmunden in the Austrian state of Upper Austria.

Geography
Kirchham lies in the Traunviertel at the foot of the last foothills of the pre-Alps at the entrance to the Salzkammergut. About 40 percent of the municipality is forest, and 53 percent is farmland.

References

Cities and towns in Gmunden District